Sugeeth is an Indian film director who works in Malayalam film industry. He made his debut directorial in 2012 with the film Ordinary.

Personal life

Sugeeth married his longtime girlfriend Saritha Nair on 6 December 2003. The couple have two children, a daughter Shivani and son Devanarayanan. Sugeeth resides in Ernakulam.

Career
Sugeeth has been an associate director to Kamal since the film Gramophone in 2003 until Aagathan in 2010. He debuted as a director in 2012 with the Malayalam film Ordinary, starring Kunchacko Boban and Biju Menon.

Filmography

References

External links
 

Malayalam film directors
Living people
1978 births